Slobodan River was a pop-rock band from Estonia, featuring Ithaka Maria, Tomi Rahula and Stig Rästa. They were together for five years and broke up around 2006.

References

Estonian pop music groups
Musical groups established in 2002
2002 establishments in Estonia